Ignite the Seven Cannons is the fourth album by English alternative rock band Felt, released in 1985. The album is sometimes referred to as "Ignite the Seven Cannons and Set Sail for the Sun", a phrase which was printed in one place on the original vinyl record.

The album marks the debut of Martin Duffy on keyboards and is the last to feature founding guitarist Maurice Deebank, thus making it the only Felt album to feature both members. It was produced by Robin Guthrie of Cocteau Twins. His bandmate Elizabeth Fraser features prominently as backing vocalist on "Primitive Painters" which became Felt's most successful single, reaching the top of the UK independent singles chart. Tracks 6, 8, 9 and 11 are instrumental.

The 2018 remastered version features six remixed songs, while the tracks on Side Two of the original vinyl release were "focused, edited and 'made symmetrical'" resulting in the loss of "Serpent Shade". Lawrence said "I got a chance to re-mix the vocals on fourth album 'Ignite The Seven Cannons'. I was never happy with the mix that was done by Robin Guthrie of the Cocteau Twins. He kind of ruined some of my best songs, which I’m sure he’d agree with now he’s a lot more experienced!"

Track listing
All songs written by Lawrence and Maurice Deebank. Track 8 was retitled "Elegance" on some reissues.

Personnel
Felt
Lawrence – guitar, vocals
Maurice Deebank – lead guitar
Marco Thomas – bass guitar
Martin Duffy – keyboards, backing vocals (tracks 2, 7, and 10)
Gary Ainge – drums

Additional personnel
Elizabeth Fraser – backing vocals (tracks 2 and 5)
Robin Guthrie – production

References

Felt (band) albums
1985 albums
Cherry Red Records albums
Albums produced by Robin Guthrie